Estelle Vogein (born 1976) is a French team handball player. She competed at the 2004 Summer Olympics in Athens, where the French team placed fourth.

References

External links

1976 births
Living people
French female handball players
Olympic handball players of France
Handball players at the 2004 Summer Olympics